Grace Choi is a fictional character appearing in American comic books published by DC Comics. The character was created by writer Judd Winick and artist Tom Raney, first appearing in Outsiders (vol. 3) #1 (August 2003) in the Modern Age of Comic Books. Choi is introduced as a young Asian American woman using her powers of superhuman strength, healing, and enhanced durability to make a living as a nightclub bouncer, who is reluctantly recruited by her superhero acquaintance Roy Harper to join his new crew of heroes, the Outsiders.

In the course of their adventures, Grace comes to take pride in her work as a superhero, and discovers that she is descended from a tribe of Amazons, explaining her better-than-human abilities, and giving her a new role model in Wonder Woman. While working with the team, she enters into a relationship with her teammate Thunder, the daughter of superhero and Outsider-founding member Black Lightning.

Outside of comics, Choi appears in the Arrowverse television series Black Lightning, portrayed by Chantal Thuy.

Fictional character biography

Origin
Grace Choi is a tall Asian-American woman with metahuman strength who sports tattoos styled along Pacific First Nations lines on both of her arms and a circular sun design around her navel.

Grace's history was explored in detail in the "Outsiders: Most Wanted" arc, in which it was revealed that she was one of the surviving victims of a prostitution ring that exploited abducted and runaway children as its "merchandise". Upon reaching puberty, Grace used her then-nascent metahuman powers to escape, and spent the next several years living independently, until her recruitment into the Outsiders.

Though initially the source of Grace's powers was not revealed, when the team was captured by the Brain and Monsieur Mallah in Outsiders (vol. 3) #39, they noted that Grace has been enhanced more than "her kind" usually is. The Outsiders were confused by that remark, leading Mallah to laugh and comment: "You mean they don't know what you are?" Later, Grace's Amazon lineage was revealed.

Joining the Outsiders
In her first appearance in Outsiders (vol. 3) #1, she was the bouncer for the metahuman nightclub Chaney's in Metropolis; Arsenal recruited her for the newly formed Outsiders. She and Arsenal were old friends but she was not very keen on joining until he told her the Outsiders job would pay her three times more than her bouncer job.

One Year Later

Grace Choi remains a member of the Outsiders, and assisted in toppling the regime of Mali. She gets along quite well with the team's newest member, Captain Boomerang II, and the two have been involved in the somewhat questionable interrogation of some soldiers, involving torture. It has been revealed that Grace has been secretly involved in a relationship with Thunder (Anissa Pierce). After an unsuccessful mission in North Korea involving Checkmate, Nightwing hands over the Outsiders to Batman, who elects to decide on his own roster culminating in DC Comics' relaunch of the Batman and the Outsiders title.

Grace features in the Amazons Attack limited series where during an attack on the United States by the Amazons, she encounters the Bana Amazons. One of its members tells her that she is actually part of their tribe, the explanation for earlier allusions by others to "her kind." This did not entirely explain Grace's metahuman powers, however, both the Bana and Themysciran Amazons possess true metahuman strength, speed, and durability. In the aftermath of the war, Batman assigns Wonder Woman and Grace to a cleanup mission which serves as an audition for his new Outsiders roster. Grace identifies herself as half-Amazonian and displays a deep knowledge of Bana-Mighdall history. Batman and Wonder Woman accept that she is a Bana, and it is confirmed when Grace successfully handles a bomb engineered so that only women with Bana DNA might control it. Diana and Grace end their joint mission describing each other as cousins.

Grace was briefly shown working alongside the Birds of Prey when they attempted to stop a group of villains from killing the Secret Six and taking Neron's "Get Out of Hell Free" card from them.

Pleased with her performance, Batman welcomes Grace as the final member of his Outsiders. Despite being angry that Thunder "washed out" during Batman's try-outs and has been excluded from the team, she accepts. She then invites Thunder back onto the team without Batman's permission. Following the apparent death of Bruce Wayne, the Outsiders fall into a trap set by Simon Hurt, and most of the team members are severely injured. The group is disbanded shortly thereafter, and is replaced by a new team of Outsiders.

Some time later, Grace shows up in Wonder Woman #600 as a member of Wonder Woman's all-female team of heroes.

Many months after her departure from the Outsiders, Grace is shown in a live-in relationship with Anissa, with both women now in a state of semi-retirement following Anissa's recovery. When Black Lightning arrives at Grace and Anissa's apartment with his small band of fugitive heroes, Grace comes to his aid and helps fight off the attacking members of the Justice Society of America. In the ensuing battle, Grace renders Stargirl and Mister America unconscious, telling them not to threaten her "in-law". After the battle with the JSA, both Grace and Thunder agree to join up with Black Lightning's small team of Outsiders, who are tasked by Amanda Waller with travelling to Markovia and capturing Geo-Force and his rogue faction of the team. Following a massive battle in Markovia, both teams of Outsiders are disbanded by Batman, and the individual heroes return home.

Powers and abilities
Grace Choi possesses metahuman levels of strength, heightened durability and endurance, as well as regeneration and increased healing.

In other media
 Grace Choi appears in Black Lightning, portrayed by Chantal Thuy. This version, also known by her real name Shay Li Wylde, is a metahuman shapeshifter who can turn into a teenager (portrayed by Stella Smith), an old man (Joseph Steven Yang), and a leopard. At a young age, she was kidnapped and forced into prostitution before she was rescued by I.C.E. She subsequently disappeared and resurfaced in Freeland as bartender "Grace Choi", but took schizophrenia medication due to her initially uncontrollable shapeshifting ability. While living in Freeland, she meets and befriends Anissa Pierce, but Choi disappears after Anissa sees her eyes changing. Eventually, the pair reunite and rekindle their relationship after Anissa accepts Choi's powers and helps her gain control of them. In time, they would also become engaged, later married, and Choi adopts the superhero alias "Wylde".
 Grace Choi appears in DC Universe Online.
 Grace Choi appears in Smallville Season 11 as a member of the Outsiders.

References

External links
 DCU Guide: Grace

Female characters in television
DC Comics Amazons
DC Comics characters who can move at superhuman speeds
DC Comics characters with superhuman strength
DC Comics characters with accelerated healing
DC Comics female superheroes
DC Comics LGBT superheroes
Fictional bisexual females
Fictional LGBT characters in television
Comics characters introduced in 2003
Characters created by Judd Winick
DC Comics characters who are shapeshifters
Chinese superheroes